{{Speciesbox
| taxon = Corynebacterium jeikeium
| authority = Jackman et al. 1988
| type_strain =
| synonyms = * Group JK Corynebacterium
}}Corynebacterium jeikeium is a rod-shaped, catalase-positive, aerobic species of Actinomycetota in the genus Corynebacterium. C. jeikeium is pathogenic, typically causing an opportunistic infection seen most frequently in bone marrow transplant patients. C. jeikeium is a strictly aerobic organism and forms tiny grayish white colonies when grown on blood agar. C. jeikeium'' is usually susceptible to vancomycin and tetracycline. Resistance to macrolide antibiotics is often encountered.

It can be acquired in hospitals. Its genome has been sequenced.

References

External links
Type strain of Corynebacterium jeikeium at BacDive -  the Bacterial Diversity Metadatabase

Corynebacterium
Gram-positive bacteria
Bacteria described in 1988